Energy for Sustainable Development is a peer-reviewed academic journal covering research on energy-related aspects of sustainable development. It is published by Elsevier and the editor-in-chief is Daniel B. Jones. According to the Journal Citation Reports, the journal has a 2018 impact factor of 3.307, and a five year impact factor (from 2018 backwards) of 3.691.

References

External links 
 

Elsevier academic journals
Publications established in 1993
English-language journals
Energy and fuel journals
Sustainable development